Coral Coast may refer to:
 Coral Coast, Western Australia, between Cervantes and Exmouth, Western Australia
 Coral Coast, Fiji, between Sigatoka and Suva, Fiji